Freak Out is an American reality television series where people prank their close friends and family. The show premiered as a two-night one-hour special on October 21 and October 22, 2014. The first season premiered on March 25, 2015 and ended on May 27, 2015.

Episodes

Specials (2014)

Season 1 (2015)

References

External links
 

2014 American television series debuts
2015 American television series endings
2010s American comedy television series
2010s American reality television series
ABC Family original programming
American hidden camera television series
English-language television shows
Television series by Disney–ABC Domestic Television